Hugh Bevan (21 December 1932 – 15 June 2005) was an Australian cricketer. He played 43 first-class matches for Western Australia between 1956/57 and 1963/64.

References

External links
 

1932 births
2005 deaths
Australian cricketers
Western Australia cricketers
Cricketers from Perth, Western Australia